The 2004–05 Phoenix Coyotes season was the franchise's 33rd season overall, 26th National Hockey League season and their ninth season in Phoenix, however its games were cancelled as the 2004–05 NHL lockout could not be resolved in time.

Schedule
The Coyotes preseason and regular season schedules were announced on July 8 and July 14, 2004, respectively.

|-
| 1 || September 23 || @ Los Angeles Kings
|-
| 2 || September 24 || @ Anaheim Mighty Ducks
|-
| 3 || September 25 || @ San Jose Sharks
|-
| 4 || October 1 || Los Angeles Kings
|-
| 5 || October 5 || Anaheim Mighty Ducks
|-
| 6 || October 9 || San Jose Sharks
|-

|-
| 1 || October 13 || Dallas Stars
|-
| 2 || October 14 || @ Dallas Stars
|-
| 3 || October 16 || @ Minnesota Wild
|-
| 4 || October 21 || Tampa Bay Lightning
|-
| 5 || October 23 || @ Los Angeles Kings
|-
| 6 || October 24 || Buffalo Sabres
|-
| 7 || October 27 || @ Colorado Avalanche
|-
| 8 || October 28 || Columbus Blue Jackets
|-
| 9 || October 30 || Calgary Flames
|-
| 10 || November 3 || @ San Jose Sharks
|-
| 11 || November 4 || Chicago Blackhawks
|-
| 12 || November 6 || @ Detroit Red Wings
|-
| 13 || November 7 || @ Chicago Blackhawks
|-
| 14 || November 9 || @ Minnesota Wild
|-
| 15 || November 11 || Vancouver Canucks
|-
| 16 || November 13 || Minnesota Wild
|-
| 17 || November 15 || @ Pittsburgh Penguins
|-
| 18 || November 16 || @ Washington Capitals
|-
| 19 || November 18 || @ Columbus Blue Jackets
|-
| 20 || November 20 || St. Louis Blues
|-
| 21 || November 22 || San Jose Sharks
|-
| 22 || November 24 || Anaheim Mighty Ducks
|-
| 23 || November 26 || Los Angeles Kings
|-
| 24 || December 2 || Atlanta Thrashers
|-
| 25 || December 4 || Dallas Stars
|-
| 26 || December 7 || @ San Jose Sharks
|-
| 27 || December 9 || Chicago Blackhawks
|-
| 28 || December 11 || Florida Panthers
|-
| 29 || December 15 || Colorado Avalanche
|-
| 30 || December 17 || @ Columbus Blue Jackets
|-
| 31 || December 18 || @ St. Louis Blues
|-
| 32 || December 22 || @ San Jose Sharks
|-
| 33 || December 23 || @ Vancouver Canucks
|-
| 34 || December 26 || @ Anaheim Mighty Ducks
|-
| 35 || December 29 || Detroit Red Wings
|-
| 36 || December 31 || San Jose Sharks
|-
| 37 || January 2 || @ Colorado Avalanche
|-
| 38 || January 4 || @ Dallas Stars
|-
| 39 || January 5 || @ Chicago Blackhawks
|-
| 40 || January 8 || Edmonton Oilers
|-
| 41 || January 12 || @ Philadelphia Flyers
|-
| 42 || January 13 || @ New York Rangers
|-
| 43 || January 15 || @ New York Islanders
|-
| 44 || January 17 || St. Louis Blues
|-
| 45 || January 20 || Los Angeles Kings
|-
| 46 || January 22 || Detroit Red Wings
|-
| 47 || January 25 || Nashville Predators
|-
| 48 || January 27 || Calgary Flames
|-
| 49 || January 29 || @ St. Louis Blues
|-
| 50 || January 31 || @ Carolina Hurricanes
|-
| 51 || February 3 || @ Nashville Predators
|-
| 52 || February 5 || Carolina Hurricanes
|-
| 53 || February 8 || @ Calgary Flames
|-
| 54 || February 9 || @ Edmonton Oilers
|-
| 55 || February 16 || @ Anaheim Mighty Ducks
|-
| 56 || February 17 || Boston Bruins
|-
| 57 || February 19 || Washington Capitals
|-
| 58 || February 21 || @ Los Angeles Kings
|-
| 59 || February 23 || Anaheim Mighty Ducks
|-
| 60 || February 25 || Los Angeles Kings
|-
| 61 || February 27 || @ Edmonton Oilers
|-
| 62 || March 1 || @ Vancouver Canucks
|-
| 63 || March 3 || Vancouver Canucks
|-
| 64 || March 5 || Minnesota Wild
|-
| 65 || March 8 || @ Detroit Red Wings
|-
| 66 || March 10 || @ Nashville Predators
|-
| 67 || March 12 || New Jersey Devils
|-
| 68 || March 13 || @ Los Angeles Kings
|-
| 69 || March 15 || New York Islanders
|-
| 70 || March 17 || @ Calgary Flames
|-
| 71 || March 19 || @ Ottawa Senators
|-
| 72 || March 21 || @ Montreal Canadiens
|-
| 73 || March 22 || @ Toronto Maple Leafs
|-
| 74 || March 24 || Edmonton Oilers
|-
| 75 || March 26 || Colorado Avalanche
|-
| 76 || March 28 || Columbus Blue Jackets
|-
| 77 || March 30 || @ Anaheim Mighty Ducks
|-
| 78 || March 31 || Anaheim Mighty Ducks
|-
| 79 || April 2 || San Jose Sharks
|-
| 80 || April 6 || @ Dallas Stars
|-
| 81 || April 8 || Dallas Stars
|-
| 82 || April 10 || Nashville Predators
|-

Transactions
The Coyotes were involved in the following transactions from June 8, 2004, the day after the deciding game of the 2004 Stanley Cup Finals, through February 16, 2005, the day the  season was officially cancelled.

Trades

Players acquired

Players lost

Signings

Draft picks
Phoenix's picks at the 2004 NHL Entry Draft, which was held at the RBC Center in Raleigh, North Carolina on June 26–27, 2004.

Notes

References

Pho
Pho
Arizona Coyotes seasons
2004 in sports in Arizona
2005 in sports in Arizona